This list of cemeteries in Riverside County, California includes currently operating, historical (closed for new interments), and defunct (graves abandoned or removed) cemeteries, columbaria, and mausolea in Riverside County, California. It does not include pet cemeteries. Selected interments are given for notable people.



See also
 List of cemeteries in California
 List of cemeteries in San Bernardino County, California

Footnotes

Further reading

External links

 Riverside County cemeteries at Find a Grave

Cemeteries
 
History of Riverside County, California
Geography of Riverside County, California
Riverside County